The Santana 28 is an American sailboat that was designed by W. Shad Turner as a cruiser and first built in 1976.

The design was developed into the Santana 228 in 1978, after just two years in production. The 228 has a redesigned, wedge-shaped coach house house and a taller rig with 8% greater sail area and replaced the 28 in the company's product line.

Production
The design was built by W. D. Schock Corp in the United States, from 1976, until 1978, with 40 boats completed, but it is now out of production. The replacement Santana 228 also lasted two years in production, from 1978 to 1980, with 47 boats built.

Design
The Santana 28 is a recreational keelboat, built predominantly of fiberglass, with wood trim. It has a masthead sloop rig, a raked stem, a nearly-plumb transom, an internally mounted spade-type rudder controlled by a tiller and a fixed fin keel. It displaces  and carries  of ballast.

The design has sleeping accommodation for five people, with a double "V"-berth in the bow cabin, two straight settee berths in the main cabin and an aft quarter berth on the starboard side. The galley is located on the port side just forward of the companionway ladder. The galley is "L"-shaped and is equipped with a two-burner stove, an icebox and a sink. The head is located just aft of the bow cabin on the starboard side.

See also
List of sailing boat types

References

External links

Keelboats
1970s sailboat type designs
Sailing yachts
Sailboat type designs by W. Shad Turner
Sailboat types built by W. D. Schock Corp